Myanmar–United Kingdom relations are the bilateral and diplomatic relations between Myanmar (formerly Burma) and the United Kingdom. Myanmar has an embassy in Mayfair, London, whilst the United Kingdom operates an embassy in Yangon.

History

Myanmar was ruled by the British Empire from 1824 to 1948 and several wars were fought between the colonial power and Burmese rebels seeking independence. Myanmar eventually achieved independence from British rule on 4 January 1948, which is celebrated annually as Independence Day in Myanmar.

Recent history
The UK has raised concerns with Myanmar about the Rohingya genocide with then British Foreign Secretary Jeremy Hunt raising the issue with State Counsellor Aung San Suu Kyi during a state-visit in 2018. The UK has supported United Nations fact finding missions to Myanmar to investigate crimes against humanity, and has drafted a United Nations Security Council resolution to put a timeline on Myanmar allowing the return of more than 700,000 Rohingya Muslim refugees from neighbouring Bangladesh.

Military junta (2021—present)

Relations between Myanmar and the UK have greatly deteriorated since the coup d'état on 1 February 2021, when democratically elected leaders, including State Counsellor Aung San Suu Kyi were overthrown and detained by the Tatmadaw. The UK government strongly condemned the coup and called for a swift return to civilian rule. The UK placed sanctions on several Myanmar junta officials, including Defence Minister General Mya Tun Oo, in response to the coup.

Myanmar recalled its Ambassador to the United Kingdom Kyaw Zwar Minn on 9 March 2021, after he publicly called for the release of jailed State Counsellor Aung San Suu Kyi. He refused to return to Myanmar citing safety concerns. On 7 April 2021, Minn was locked out of the Embassy in London by a military attaché and was forced to sleep in his car overnight. He was replaced by his deputy, Chit Win. The British government acknowledged the dismissal of Minn, however they condemned the "bullying military regime" in response.

On 31 January 2022, the UK government imposed sanctions on Myanmar justice officials, including Thida Oo. The UK announced a further round of sanctions on 25 August 2022 against military-affiliated businesses in Myanmar, coinciding with the five-year anniversary of the Rohingya genocide. That same day, former British ambassador to Myanmar Vicky Bowman and her husband Htein Lin were arrested in Yangon, and were sentenced to a year in prison for "breaching immigration laws" on 2 September 2022. Myanmar was excluded from invitations by the UK government for the state funeral of Elizabeth II on 19 September 2022.

Diplomatic missions

The current Ambassador of the United Kingdom to Myanmar is Dan Chugg, who has been in that role since 2018</onlyinclude>, while the current Ambassador of Myanmar to the United Kingdom is Chit Win, who was appointed by the State Administration Council in April 2021.

See also
 Burmese people in the United Kingdom
 Foreign relations of Myanmar
 Foreign relations of the United Kingdom

References

External links
Myanmar (Burma) and the UK (gov.uk)

Myanmar–United Kingdom relations
United Kingdom
Myanmar